Mount Haddington is a massive  high shield volcano comprising much of James Ross Island in Graham Land, Antarctica. Some of its single eruptions were bigger in volume than a whole normal-sized volcano. Old eruption shorelines are widespread on the volcano's deeply eroded flanks.

Haddington formed along the Larsen Rift dominantly during the Miocene and Pliocene epochs but more recent eruptions have produced tuff cones on its slopes. The youngest tuff cones and pyroclastic cones on the eastern slope are situated below the summit icecap and may have formed in the last few thousand years. Effusive eruptions have created large deltas composed of hyaloclastite breccia and lava flows.

Mount Haddington was discovered on December 31, 1842 by the Ross expedition, a voyage of scientific exploration of the Antarctic from 1839 to 1843 led by James Clark Ross. Ross named the mountain after the Earl of Haddington, then First Lord of the Admiralty.

See also
 List of Ultras of Antarctica
 List of volcanoes in Antarctica

References

Polygenetic shield volcanoes
Miocene shield volcanoes
Pliocene shield volcanoes
Tuyas of Antarctica
Mountains of Graham Land
Volcanoes of Graham Land

Landforms of James Ross Island
Rift volcanoes